The Municipality of Gorišnica is a municipality in Slovenia. The seat of the municipality is Gorišnica. The area belongs to the traditional region of Styria. It is now included in the Drava Statistical Region.

Settlements
In addition to the municipal seat of Gorišnica, the municipality also includes the following settlements:

 Cunkovci
 Formin
 Gajevci
 Mala Vas
 Moškanjci
 Muretinci
 Placerovci
 Tibolci
 Zagojiči
 Zamušani

Notable people from Gorišnica 
Slavko Vesenjak (born 1981), Slovenian Lawyer

References

External links
 
 Municipality of Gorišnica on Geopedia
 Gorišnica municipal site

 
1994 establishments in Slovenia
Gorisnica